Sir John Prideaux (c. 1347 – 1403), of Orcheton in Modbury, Devon, was an English Member of Parliament for Devon in October 1383 and February 1386.

References

Members of the Parliament of England (pre-1707) for Devon
1347 births
1403 deaths
English MPs October 1383
English MPs 1386